Lemberan or Lambaran or Lanbaran may refer to:
Ləmbəran, Azerbaijan
Lənbəran, Azerbaijan
Lambaran, Iran